The 2019 Redbox Bowl was a college football bowl game played on December 30, 2019, with kickoff at 4:00 p.m. EST (1:00 p.m. local PDT) on Fox. It was the 18th edition of the Redbox Bowl, though only the second under the current name, and was one of the 2019–20 bowl games concluding the 2019 FBS football season. The game was sponsored by Redbox, a DVD and video game rental company.

Teams
The game was played between the California Golden Bears from the Pac-12 Conference and the Illinois Fighting Illini from the Big Ten Conference. This was the 11th meeting between the programs; Illinois led the all-time series, 7–3.

California Golden Bears

California entered the bowl with a 7–5 record (4–5 in conference). The Golden Bears finished in a three-way tie for second place in the Pac-12's North Division. They were 1–2 against ranked teams, defeating Washington while losing to Oregon and Utah. This was California's second Redbox Bowl; their 2008 team won the then-Emerald Bowl over Miami (FL), 24–17.

Illinois Fighting Illini

Illinois entered the bowl with a 6–6 record (4–5 in conference). The Fighting Illini finished in fourth place of the West Division of the Big Ten. They were also 1–2 against ranked teams, defeating Wisconsin while losing to Michigan and Iowa. This was also Illinois' second Redbox Bowl; their 2011 team won the then-Kraft Fight Hunger Bowl over UCLA, 20–14.

Game summary

Statistics

References

External links

Game statistics at statbroadcast.com

Redbox Bowl
Redbox Bowl
Redbox Bowl
Redbox Bowl
California Golden Bears football bowl games
Illinois Fighting Illini football bowl games